Orders, decorations, and medals of Kenya are awarded by the President of Kenya "in recognition of outstanding or distinguished services rendered to the nation in various capacities and responsibilities". Awards are made by the president upon the advice of a National Honours and Awards Committee in the president's office. Individuals are nominated for awards by district committees, government ministries, religious organisations, non-governmental organisations, individuals and others. The Chief of the Order of the Golden Heart is the highest honour awarded by the Kenyan government.

Awards 
 Order of the Golden Heart
1st Class – Chief of the Order of the Golden Heart (C.G.H.)
2nd Class – Elder of the Order of the Golden Heart (E.G.H.)
3rd Class – Moran of the Order of the Golden Heart (M.G.H.)
 Uhodari Medal
Order of the Burning Spear
1st Class – Chief of the Order of the Burning Spear (C.B.S.)
2nd Class – Elder of the Order of the Burning Spear (E.B.S.)
3rd Class – Moran of the Order of the Burning Spear (M.B.S.)
Order of the Grand Warrior The Order of the Grand Warrior (O.G.W) is an award presented to individuals in recognition of an outstanding service rendered to the country in different responsibilities and capacities. More importantly, it is an award presented to those who put their lives at risk to save their fellow countrymen. The recipients of the O.G.W are those who leave a lasting image on their fellow countrymen by putting their country first before their personal feelings and interests. Among the notable recipients of this award include Former Senate Speaker, Hon. David Ekwee Ethuro, current speaker of the National Assembly, Hon. Justin Bedan Muturi, former leader of the majority party in the Senate, Hon. Prof. Kithure Kindiki, and the current leader of majority party in the national assembly Hon. Adan Duale.  Another notable figure to receive this award is Salah Farah, a Kenyan Muslim who shielded Christians during an Al-Shabaab ambush in Mandera town in Kenya.

Distinguished Conduct Order
Distinguished Service Medal
Silver Star
Uzalendo Award
Head of State's Commendation (H.S.C.)
Military Division
Civilian Division

Recipients

Chief of the Order of the Golden Heart
The President of Kenya holds the position of Chief of the Order of the Golden Heart of Kenya. The incumbent is William Ruto.

The Chief of the Order of the Golden Heart of Kenya is the highest honour in Kenya, and as of 2009 the award has been bestowed on 198 people since Kenyan independence. Recipients of this award include Yoweri Museveni the President of Uganda, Aga Khan IV and Syedna Mufaddal Saifuddin, 53rd Dai al-Mutlaq of the Dawoodi Bohra community.

Elder of the Order of the Golden Heart

The Elder of the Order of the Golden Heart (E.G.H.) is the second highest honour awarded by the Kenyan government.

On 20 April 2017, President Uhuru Kenyatta awarded the Elder of the Order of the Golden Heart to His Holiness Syedna Mufaddal Saifuddin, at the inauguration of Aljamea-tus-Saifiyah in Nairobi. 

On 20 October 2019, President Kenyatta awarded the Elder of the Order of the Golden Heart of Kenya to Eliud Kipchoge for running a sub two-hour marathon in Vienna, Austria.

Bars

References

 
Kenya and the Commonwealth of Nations